Transport in Greater Nagoya (Chūkyō) is similar to that of the Tokyo and Osaka, but is more automobile oriented, as the urban density is less than Japan's two primary metropolises, and major automobile manufacturers like Toyota are based here. Still, compared to most cities of its size worldwide it has a considerable rail transport network with 3 million passenger trips daily, with a similar density and extent of passenger rail to London or New York City, (as of May 2014, the article Nagoya rail list lists 59 lines, 16 operators, 1,547.8 km of operational track and 654 stations [although stations recounted for each operator], note this data does not include any high speed rail) complemented with highways and surface streets for private motor transport. It includes public and private rail and highway networks; airports for international, domestic, and general aviation; buses; motorcycle delivery services, walking, bicycling, and commercial shipping. The nexus of the public transport system is Nagoya Station.

Public transport within Greater Nagoya has a rather extensive public transit system, only surpassed in Japan by those of Greater Tokyo and Greater Osaka.  The core of the transit network consists of 47 surface and subterranean railway lines in operation (see section Rail transport), run by numerous public and private operators; monorails, trams, fixed-guideway lines and buses support this primary rail network.  Like other cities in Japan, walking and bicycling not only to destinations but to railway stations are much more common than in many cities around the globe.

Compared to Tokyo and Osaka, usage of automobiles is rather high in Greater Nagoya. In 2001, 56.3% of trips were made using cars, 10% by railway, 1% by bus, 17.8% by walking, 14.5% by two-wheelers (including delivery services).

Air transport

Airport

Primary airports
Until 2005, Nagoya Airfield (also known as Komaki Airport) was the area's main airport. Chūbu Centrair International Airport has since become the main domestic and international hub for the region.

Secondary airports
Nearby airports outside the region include newly opened Shizuoka Airport and those in Greater Osaka.

Military
There are also a number of Japan Air Self-Defense Force military airfields.
Komaki Airport

Rail transport

Overview 
The passenger rail network in Greater Nagoya is fairly dense with 3 million passenger daily (1.095 billion annually).  Passenger railway usage and density is lower than that of Greater Tokyo or Greater Osaka, as generally the trend in Japan, few free maps exist of the entire network, operators show only the stations of a their respective company and key transfer points.  In addition to above-ground and below-ground rail lines, the Tōkaidō Shinkansen serves as the backbone of intercity rail transport.  The Chuo Shinkansen is planned to pass through Nagoya.

In the Greater Nagoya area there are 59 operating passenger rail lines and two tourist-oriented cable car lines–the Kinkazan Ropeway and the Gozaisho Ropeway.

Japan Railway

Central Japan Railway Company (JR Central)
Tōkaidō Shinkansen
Tōkaidō Main Line
Chūō Main Line
Kansai Main Line
Takayama Main Line
Taita Line

Kintetsu Railway

Kinki Nippon Railway (Kintetsu)
Nagoya Line
Yunoyama Line
Suzuka Line
Yamada Line
Toba Line
Shima Line
Utsube Line
Hachiōji Line

Meitetsu Railway

Nagoya Railroad (Meitetsu)
Nagoya Line
Hashima Line
Takehana Line
Bisai Line
Tsushima Line
Kakamigahara Line
Inuyama Line
Hiromi Line
Chikkō Line
Tokoname Line
Airport Line
Kōwa Line
Chita New Line
Toyota Line
Mikawa Line
Nishio Line
Gamagōri Line
Toyokawa Line
Seto Line
Komaki Line

Subway operators

Nagoya Municipal Subway
Higashiyama Line
Meijō Line
Meikō Line
Tsurumai Line
Sakura-dōri Line
Kamiiida Line

List of passenger railway lines in operation
Aichi Rapid Transit
Nagoya Seaside Rapid Railway
Tōkai Transport Service
Aichi Loop Railway
Ise Railway

List of cable car systems in operation
Kinkazan Ropeway
Gozaisho Ropeway

List of freight-only lines in operation
 Kinuura Rinkai Railway

Bus rapid transit 
 Yutorito Line

Road transport

Expressways
 Chūō Expressway
 Chita-Hanto Expressway
 Tōkai-Hokuriku Expressway
 Tōkai Ring Expressway
 Tomei Expressway
 Meishin Expressway
 Higashi-Meihan Expressway
 Isewangan Expressway
 New Tōmei Expressway (under construction)

Buses
There are numerous private and public bus companies with hundreds of routes throughout the region.  Most local bus routes complement existing rail service to form an effective intermodal transit network.

Like those in other major cities, an extensive network of intercity buses spreads out across the country from Nagoya.

Private/commercial autos
The number of registered autos in Aichi in 2014 was close to 5 million out of 7.5 million people.  In contrast, suburban Tokyo's Saitama prefecture has 7.3 million people, but a million fewer registered autos. Kei car percentage was similar between the two.  Like all Japan, transition to kei cars is increasing year by year.

Maritime transport

Seaport
Major area seaports include:
Port of Kinuura
Port of Nagoya
Port of Mikawa (Toyohashi Port)
Port of Yokkaichi

Passenger ferries 

 Nagoya's international ferry connections are not so extensive, however domestically it is served by Taiheiyō Ferry for Sendai and Tomakomai. Some routes between Tokyo and Osaka make stops at Nagoya.
 Ise-wan Ferry plys commuter routes between the Aichi side and Mie side.

Shipping 
Shipping plays a crucial role for moving freight in and out of the Greater Nagoya area, with finished automobiles for export are handled by ports in the region. However, with the just-in-time requirements of automobile manufacturers and suppliers regional airports also handle much cargo.

Greater Nagoya is home to six existing regasification LNG terminals.

Other modes

Greater Nagoya is little different from the rest of Japan in the other modes of transport.

See also
 List of urban rail systems in Japan
 Transport in Greater Tokyo
 Transport in Keihanshin
 Transport in Fukuoka-Kitakyūshū

References

External links
 Greater Nagoya Railway Network Map 
 Nagoya subway map 

Transport in Japan
Transport in Aichi Prefecture
Transport in Gifu Prefecture
Transport in Mie Prefecture